This page shows the results of the Diving Competition for men and women at the 1959 Pan American Games, held from August 27 to September 7, 1959 in Chicago, United States. There were two events, for both men and women.

Men's competition

3m Springboard

10m Platform

Women's competition

3m Springboard

10m Platform

Medal table

See also
 Diving at the 1956 Summer Olympics
 Diving at the 1960 Summer Olympics

References
 Sports 123

1959
Events at the 1959 Pan American Games
Pan American Games
1959 Pan American Games
1959 Pan American Games